The Journal of Electronic Materials is a monthly peer-reviewed scientific journal that publishes studies, research, developments, and applications of materials that produce electronics. The editor-in-chief is Shadi Shahedipour-Sandvik, SUNY Polytechnic Institute.The IEEE/TMS Journal of Electronic Materials (JEM) is jointly sponsored by the IEEE Electron Devices Society and The Minerals, Metals and Materials Society. It is published by Springer on behalf of IEEE and TMS. 

The journal also investigates the latest uses for semiconductors, magnetic alloys, dielectrics, nanoscale materials, and photonic materials. It also publishes methodologies for  investigating the chemical properties, physical properties, and the electronic, and optical properties of these materials. Also, the specific materials science involves transistors, nanotechnology, electronic packaging, detectors, emitters, metallization, superconductivity, and energy applications. 

Publishing formats include review papers and selected conference papers. Specialists and non-specialists, interested in this journal's topical coverage, are the target audience .

Abstracting and indexing 
According to the Journal Citation Reports, the Journal of Electronic Materials has a 2020 impact factor of 1.938. 

The journal is indexed by the following services:

External links

References 

Materials science journals
Publications established in 1972
Monthly journals
English-language journals
Springer Science+Business Media academic journals
Electronics journals